"September Gurls" is a song by the rock band Big Star. Written by Alex Chilton, it was featured on the group's second studio album Radio City. The track was released in 1974.

Background

The song was named in tribute to the Beach Boys' "California Girls".

"September Gurls" was also released as a single. While it never was a big seller, it is considered a classic song by publications such as Rolling Stone and Allmusic.  

The track was rated #180 by Rolling Stone in the magazine's top 500 songs of all time, and is described as a "power pop classic".

Jason Ankeny of Allmusic describes the song as "sweetly gorgeous sound that's both familiar and novel; poignantly ragged and breathlessly reckless..." and says it "reveals a surprising tenderness, tempering its venom with achingly lovely vocals and sun-kissed harmonies".

Novelist Michael Chabon calls the song "the pocket history of power pop" and claims that it is "the greatest number-one song that never charted".

Covers

The Bangles released a cover of this song on their 1986 album Different Light.  Other bands who have recorded the song include Superdrag and The Searchers.

Tributes
The title of Katy Perry's 2010 number one hit "California Gurls" was spelled thus as a tribute to Chilton and Big Star. Perry's manager is a fan of the band, and asked her to spell "girls" with a "u".

References

Further reading
 Klosterman, Chuck. (2016) But What If We're Wrong? Penguin Publishing Group.

1974 songs
Songs written by Alex Chilton
Big Star songs
Ardent Records singles
Musical tributes to the Beach Boys
Jangle pop songs